The 2005 WNBA season was the ninth for the Phoenix Mercury. The Mercury missed the playoffs for the fifth consecutive season, falling a game short.

Offseason

WNBA Draft

Regular season

Season standings

Season schedule

Player stats

References

External links
Mercury on Basketball Reference

Phoenix Mercury seasons
Phoenix
Phoenix Mercury